Ford Performance Vehicles was the Melbourne-based, premium performance arm of automobile manufacturer Ford Australia. The company produced a range of Ford-based models from 2002 to 2014 under the FPV marque name.

History
The roots of FPV can be traced back to 1991, when the English automotive engineering company Tickford began a collaboration with Ford Australia to produce high-performance variants of the Australian Falcon range. The partnership, Tickford Vehicle Engineering, saw the introduction of the Ford Falcon S-XR6 and Ford Falcon S-XR8 models. This was followed in October 1999 by the launch of the Ford Tickford Experience dealer network and the FTE T-Series range based on Ford's AU Falcon and Fairlane models.

In 2002, following the purchase of Tickford by Prodrive, the Ford Performance Vehicles company was formed as a joint venture between Ford Australia and Prodrive. The FPV brand name was created to replace the FTE name and a restructured range was developed based on the Ford BA Falcon, seeing the return of the GT nameplate to a Falcon-based product for the first time since the "30th Anniversary GT", and as a regular production model since the XB Falcon GT. The range was headlined by the FPV GT-P, and included a turbo-charged model based on the XR6 Turbo.

Over the years, FPV expanded the range to include a High Performance version of the Ford Territory as well as a number of special editions and anniversary models. The purchase from Prodrive also saw a factory backed V8 Supercar outfit in Ford Performance Racing.

In August 2012, Ford Australia announced its purchase of FPV assets to continue the engineering, manufacturing and marketing of that performance brand in Australia. In preparation for Ford Australia's manufacturing shutdown, the FPV brand and its range were discontinued in 2014, after 12 years of production and marketing.

Nameplates

FPV used a number of nameplates for its vehicles. The following are the main series of models offered during the company's run. 
F6-E
Replaced the Force 6 as the luxury orientated 6-cyl offering.
F6 Typhoon/Tornado
Introduced in 2004 with the BA MkII, used an improved version of the "Barra" 4.0L turbo. Prior to the release of the FG series F6 in 2008, the sedan and utility models were marketed as the F6 Typhoon and F6 Tornado respectively.
F6-X
SUV product based on the Ford Territory.
Force 6
Luxury orientated offering, using the Typhoon engine, but with low-key looks.
Force 8
Luxury orientated offering, using the GT drive-train, but with low-key looks. Positioned above the GT-P as the flagship model until the GT-E.
GS
Intended to sit below the GT and provide a lower entry-point to the FPV range.
GT
Served as the Falcon-based entry level product until the arrival of the GS in 2010.
GT-E
Replacing the Force 8 as the top-of-the-line FPV offering.
GT-P
Higher specification of the GT, with most options standard.
GT-F
"Final" GT Rendition, 550 completed, with Miami Supercharged engine.

Model Series (Ford Falcon-based)

BA

The 2002 BA range included the GT, GT-P, and the Pursuit. The GT was the entry-level vehicle that started with a suggested retail price of A$59,810.  The GT-P was the upmarket version of the GT, with a price tag of A$69,850. The Pursuit was a ute (utility) version of the GT, featuring the same seats, basic dash/interior package and wheels. A FPV specific body-kit was applied to all cars, using the lights from the XR-range. The kit had a strong resemblance to the BA Falcon V8 Supercar, highlighting the connection to FPR.

All three were powered by a unique version of Ford's 5.4-litre Modular V8, with DOHC 4-valve cylinder heads from the Mustang Cobra R engine. FPV named this uniquely tuned engine as the Boss 290 because of its power output.

Featured Models
GT
GT-P
Pursuit (ute)

MkII update

The GT, GT-P and Pursuit received a new stripe package with bonnet decals, a six-speed Tremec T56 manual and the GT-P received 19" five-spoke alloy wheels. FPV also released the Super Pursuit, which was a Pursuit ute with GT-P extras.

New six cylinder sedan and utility models were added to the range, the F6 Typhoon (sedan) and F6 Tornado (ute). The F6 was visually separated from the GT range with the use of a different pattern in the front bumper grill mesh, and a smaller boot spoiler on the sedan.

Featured Models
F6 Tornado (utility)
F6 Typhoon (sedan)
GT
GT-P
Pursuit (utility)
Super Pursuit (utility)

BF

This new range was launched in 2005 with engine specifications unchanged. All models shared the same six-speed manual and were now offered with an optional German made ZF six-speed automatic (the same as featured in Jaguars and BMWs). The GT received the GT-P's old 19-inch wheels, and the GT-P and Super Pursuit received their own specific road wheel styles. Typhoon & Tornado versions had optional 18-inch road wheel design used on the previous model, or a new 19-inch design with black spokes. All models also received new body kits, with the F6 Typhoon benefiting from its own unique styling changes. The F6 now had color coded fog lamp surrounds, and a lower grill insert emphasizing the intercooler. The rear now had a new bumper with mesh inserts, a deeper diffuser, with the GT models now sporting a dual exit exhaust system cut into the diffuser.

Featured Models
F6 Tornado (utility)
F6 Typhoon (sedan)
GT
GT-P
Pursuit (utility)
Super Pursuit (utility)

MkII update

No mechanical changes were introduced with this update; however, all models came standard with 19 inch rims. Subtle styling changes were made, but the most significant news was the introduction of new Force 6 and Force 8 models. Built to rival HSV's Senator Signature, they are mechanically identical to the auto-equipped GT model, but in a more luxury-focused package with more conservative visuals (no rear wing and more conservative colour range). The Force models are essentially an FPV version of the Fairmont Ghia (luxury model in the Falcon range).

In the final months of the BF MkII Falcon, a number of limited edition models were released - namely, the GT "40th Anniversary" (to commemorate the Falcon GT nameplate).; the F6 "R-Spec" Typhoon, which is the only limited edition turbo FPV and the only turbo Rspec ever; the GT "Cobra R-spec" sedan and utility (all of which received stiffer "R-Spec" dampers and, in the case of the sedan, a power increase to 

Featured Models
F6 Tornado (utility)
F6 Typhoon(sedan)
Force 6
Force 8
GT
GT-P
Pursuit (utility)
Super Pursuit (utility)

Special editions
F6 "R-spec" Typhoon
GT "40th Anniversary Edition"
GT "Cobra R-spec"

FG

The FG series FPV was launched in 2008. All models were based on the Australian Ford FG Falcon and included the 6-cylinder F6 sedan, F6 Ute (the former Typhoon and Tornado names having been retired) and F6 E sedan, the V8 powered GS Sedan and Ute and the V8 engined GT, GT-P and GT E sedans. GS models used a detuned version of the GT 315 (different to the Boss 302 from the BF MK II)

4 limited editions GT's were released during the FG series, the first being the GT 5th Anniversary, celebrating 5-years since the start of FPV. The "Black Edition" followed, and the R-Spec and GT-F arriving in the MkII update.

Featured Models
F6 (sedan & utility)
F6
F6 E
GS
GS (utility)
GT
GT E
GT-P
Pursuit (utility)
Super Pursuit (utility)

Special editions
GT 5th anniversary

MY10 update

In October 2010 (before the FG MkII update), the 5.4 L V8 was replaced with the new 5.0 L Supercharged (Miami) V8. The GT range now produces  and the GS . It is capable of a sub 5 second 0–100 km/h (0-62 mph) time, surpassing the HSV GTS (the FPV's main rival) in both power and torque. The decision was brought about because of pressure to convert to Euro IV emissions, which the 5.4 L was unable to pass.

During this time, the Pursuit and Super Pursuit utilities were dropped, with the GS being the only V8 ute option in regular production.

Featured Models
F6 (sedan & utility)
F6
F6 E
GS
GS (utility)
GT
GT E
GT-P
XR6 (Mar 2011 only)
Special editions
GT Black

MkII Update

The FPV range received the updates from the Falcon (FG) MkII range in December 2011, however, the GS sedan and utility received the cosmetic updates from the XR-series.

FPV released the track focused version of the R-spec in 2012, using the current GT with its / supercharged 5.0-litre V8 engine, creating Australia's fastest accelerating production car.[5] It is seen by many as the spiritual successor the famed "HO" series of GT's, that ended with the Ford XY Falcon GT. Ford (FPV) however, is reluctant to use the "HO" tag on a modern-day equivalent.

The GT-F 351 marked the end for the Ford Falcon GT / FPV GT model lines, the "F" standing for Final, and "351" paying homage to Falcon GTs of the 1960s and 1970s. It features a retuned version of the Coyote 5.0 litre V8 to produce , with over  available through over-boost when the conditions allow, the GT-F also gain's the handling upgrades from the R-spec. The exterior is identified through black highlights on the mirrors, spoiler and door handles, as well as a unique stripe package including a stripe running over the top of the car.

Featured Models
F6 (sedan & utility)
F6
F6 E
GS
GS (utility)
GT
GT E
GT-P
Special editions
GT R-spec
Pursuit (utility) (in both R-spec and GT-F visuals)
GT-F 351

GT-F "351"

Presented in June 2014, the GT-F 351 is the last Falcon-based GT sedan and last FPV model (along with the Pursuit Ute), with a total production of 500 reserved for Australia at $77,990 and another 50 for New Zealand. Its nomenclature was chosen to mean "F" for final whereas "351" is this GT-F's engine output in kW as well as a homage to the iconic  engine capacity of the 1970s GT Falcon (XW to XB series). Inside, the GT-F is characterised by darker finishes, orange accents throughout (e.g. trim stitching, instrument facia and GT-F seat embroiding) and a build number plate complemented by a certificate. The exterior features stealth or black accents (specifically, the headlight and foglight bezels are black, as are the external mirrors, door handles, rear spoiler and diffuser, alloy wheels) and a unique GT-F stripe package (including over the roof of the car) that is available in different colours depending on exterior paints, which are Winter White, Silhouette (black), Kinetic (blue), Octane (orange) and Smoke (grey).

This gave it far more power than Australian racing V8 Supercars and it is, as of 2015, Australia's most powerful police vehicle. It was commissioned by the NSW police force as a promotional car, although it is a fully equipped and operational highway patrol police vehicle.

FPV auctioned build number 001 and the last (for Australia) build number 500 on eBay, with a view to donate proceedings to the National Breast Cancer Foundation. These cars were sold for $236,100 and $157,600 and attracted 84 and 106 bids, respectively.

Model Series (Ford Territory-based)

F6X

In January 2008, Ford Performance Vehicles unveiled the FPV F6X, a high-performance, luxury version of the Ford Territory crossover. The F6X is fitted with the F6 270 Turbo 4.0 L DOHC in-line six-cylinder engine, a ZF six-speed automatic transmission and a full-time all-wheel-drive system.

The F6X was discontinued in February 2009, with 251 examples having been built.

Concept Cars

Galaxie 540
During a 2004 FPV open day, FPV had a clay model of a Fairlane on display. It Featured a custom front end with GT headlamps and bonnet, and a custom bodykit.

Territory P-SUV
For a 2007 open day, FPV had a Territory-based concept on display. The P-SUV had an open rear section behind the rear seats. The floor of the open rear section and its extension was covered in machine finish metal sheets with the same material covering the fold-down rear seat backs.

GT "Black Edition" concept
For the 2011 Melbourne motor show, FPV displayed the "FLPV concept" (commonly known as the "Black Edition"), based on the just released supercharged  GT series. It featured an all-black appearance, and a unique front bumper and staggered wheel design at the time considered to be available on future FPV products. However, these failed to make an appearance, with only the use of wider rear wheels making the R-spec and GT-F limited editions.

Engines

5.4L Modular "Boss" V8

Boss 290
Based on the cast iron 4V DOHC Boss short blocks sourced from Windsor, Ontario, the Boss engines include some locally sourced parts such as intake and pistons coupled with DOHC 4-valve cylinder heads from the Mustang Cobra R engine. FPV named this uniquely tuned engine as the Boss 290 because of its power output. It produced 290 kW (394 PS; 389 bhp) at 5,500 rpm and 520 N·m (380 lb·ft) of torque at 4,500 rpm.

Boss 302
For the BFII FPV GT Cobra special edition, the Boss 302 was created. The GT Cobra motor produced 405 hp (302 kW) and 398 lb·ft (540 N·m)). The Boss 302 motor was also added to all V8-powered FPV models until the release of the FG in 2008. The Boss 302 was then used for the limited edition FPV GS in the FG range.

Boss 315
For the FG MkI, the 5.4 was further tuned to produce 315 kW (428 PS; 422 bhp) and 551 N·m (406 lb·ft). FPV achieved this through a new camshaft profile, new camshaft timing, strengthened piston assembly and a higher compression ratio (10.5:1 to 10.8:1).

5.0L Coyote "Miami" V8
In October 2010 FPV retired the 5.4L Boss V8, in favour of a new supercharged 5.0L V8. The project, codenamed "Miami", is based on the Coyote 5.0 litre V8 and is a supercharged alloy quad cam engine. It has cost FPV $40 million and has taken 3 years to develop. The engine was offered in three versions, Boss 315, 335 and finally 351.

With the closure of FPV, the Boss 335 engine was used in the returning XR8 model with the FG-X range. Another variation was developed for the special edition XR8 sprint, that developed .

Boss 315
Used in the entry level GS sedan and ute, the Boss 315 produces 315 kW (428 PS; 422 bhp) at 5,750 rpm and 545 N·m (402 lb·ft) between 2,000 - 5,500 rpm.

Boss 335

The latter is offered in the GT range, which includes GT, GT-P, and GT-E. Fuel economy was improved dropping 4.5% to 13.7 L/100 km for the auto and 13.6 L/100 km for the manual.

Boss 345

Exclusive to the FG X XR8 Sprint, the Boss 345 developed 345 kW of power and 575 Nm of torque, with base torque figures being just 1 Nm shy of the XR6 Sprint. In favourable atmospheric conditions, overboost mode raised the output to 400 kW / 650 Nm, being equal with the figures produced by the FPV GT-F. The Boss 345 had the build number inscribed onto the top of the engine, instead of any reference to power figures as with previous iterations.

Boss 351

This is a specially tuned variant of the 5.0L unique to the GT-F, similar to the Cobra before it, the 351 is a reference to the Cleveland engines offered in the Falcon in the past.

4.0L "Barra" I6

Barra 1000

Barra 310

With the FG series, the Garret GT3540 was retained as opposed to the smaller GT3576 used in the FG XR6 Turbo. As a result, 

Barra 325

Exclusively fitted to the FGX XR6 Turbo Sprint. It was essentially a Barra 270T with a Garrett GT3540 and revised carbon fibre intake.

Motorsport

V8 Supercars

Ford Performance Racing (FPR) was created by Prodrive in 2003 to establish a link between the FPV road car range and the Ford Falcon V8 Supercars. Given the team's massive budget, its early results were disappointing but a form reversal in 2006 saw the team finish second in the Teams' standings. Mark Winterbottom also placed second in the Drivers Championship in 2008. In January 2013 the team was sold by Prodrive to Rusty French and Rod Nash. The team achieved their first Bathurst 1000 victory in 2013 with Mark Winterbottom and Steven Richards driving a Falcon FG. In 2015, Ford Performance Racing was renamed as Prodrive Racing Australia as a result of Ford's decision to progressively withdraw its V8 Supercars support by 2016.

FPR drivers have included Craig Lowndes, Glenn Seton, Greg Ritter, David Brabham, David Besnard, Jason Bright, Mark Winterbottom, Steven Richards and Will Davison.

Drifting
FPV created a show car dubbed the 'DRIF6' - an F6 Typhoon with modifications making the car suitable for competitive drifting. The car was entered into the national-level Drift Australia Series in 2006, where it was driven by Adam 'Newtonmeter' Newton. One of the car's main objectives was to expose the FPV brand to a younger audience than its usual, traditional V8-driving crowd.

Apart from Adam Newton, only Gary Myers of Summernats Burnout fame has driven the car.  Gary drove the F6 for Street Machine Magazine, and commented the vehicle had incredible power.

The F6 drift car managed to score a best qualifying position of 5th at Mallala Motorsport Park in Adelaide, South Australia.  In the Queensland Round of racing, the car suffered damage when Warren Luff, a professional race driver, took to the wheel for a few demo laps.  Under Warren's control the car only made the end of the back straight of Queensland Raceway before it was turned passenger side first into the wall and Warren ended up in hospital with a fractured nose.

The damaged vehicle made an appearance in China to bolster one of its sponsors agendas. Ford Australia brought the vehicle back to Australia and it can be seen at the Ford Australia Discovery Centre in Geelong Victoria.

See also

Ford Falcon GT
FPV F6 Typhoon
Tickford Vehicle Engineering

References

External links
 Official website (archived, 27 Sep 2002) 
 Ford Australia

Performance Vehicles
FPV vehicles
Car manufacturers of Australia
Official motorsports and performance division of automakers
Ford Motor Company Marques